Selangau may refer to:

Selangau
Selangau (federal constituency), represented in the Dewan Rakyat